Defrance or DeFrance may refer to:
 Chris DeFrance (born 1956), a former American football player
 Hélène Defrance (born 1986), French sailor
 Jacques Louis Marin DeFrance (1758-1850), a French malacologist
 Jean-Marie Defrance (1771–1855), a French General of the French Revolutionary Wars and the Napoleonic Wars
 Jules Defrance, a Belgian racing cyclist
 Léonard Defrance (1735-1805), a Flemish painter